Ərəbmehdibəy (also, Arabmekhdibey, Arabmekhdybey, Arabmekhtibek, and Arabmekhtibeyli) is a village and municipality in the Agsu Rayon of Azerbaijan.  It has a population of 1,580.  The municipality consists of the villages of Ərəbmehdibəy, Dədəli, Qasımbəyli, and Mustafalı.

References 

Populated places in Agsu District